The 1996–97 Turkish Cup was the 35th edition of the tournament that determined the association football Süper Lig Turkish Cup champion under the auspices of the Turkish Football Federation (TFF). champion under the auspices of the Turkish Football Federation (TFF). Kocaelispor successfully contested Trabzonspor on both legs of the finals. The results of the tournament also determined which clubs would be promoted or relegated.

First round

Second round

Third round

Fourth round

Fifth round

Sixth round

Quarter-finals

Semi-finals

Summary table

|}

1st leg

2nd leg

Final

1st leg

2nd leg

See also
 1996–97 1.Lig

References

Turkish Cup seasons
Cup
Turkish